Bill Quateman (born November 4, 1947, Chicago, Illinois) is an American singer-songwriter. Quateman released four albums in the 1970s and charted with the single "Only Love", which reached No. 86 on the Billboard Hot 100 in 1973.

Discography
Bill Quateman (Columbia Records, 1972) U.S. No. 206
Night After Night (RCA Victor, 1977) U.S. No. 129
Shot in the Dark (RCA Victor, 1977)
Just Like You (RCA Victor, 1979)
The Almost Eve of Everything (Next of Kin Music, 2000)
Trust with Buzz Feiten (Dreamsville Records, 2002)

References

Singers from Chicago
American male singer-songwriters
Living people
1947 births
20th-century American singers
20th-century American male singers
Singer-songwriters from Illinois